Central District was an electoral district for the Legislative Council of South Australia from 1882 until 1912. Prior to the passing of the Constitution Act Further Amendment Act 1881, the Legislative Council had been 18 members elected by people from across the entire Province.

At its creation in 1882, the Central District consisted of six electoral districts for the South Australian House of Assembly - East Adelaide, West Adelaide, North Adelaide, West Torrens, Sturt, Port Adelaide. It covered the area of the City of Adelaide and the surrounding areas on the south, west and northwest.

Members
When created, the district was to elect six members to the Legislative Council which had been increased to 24 members, six from each of four districts. Transitional arrangements meant that members were only to be elected from the new districts as the terms of the existing members expired. From 1891, all members of the Council were elected by districts.

The Constitution Act Amendment Act 1901 reduced the size of the parliament, but Central District was the only one to continue to elect six members, from a slightly larger area including some of the Adelaide Hills. The Constitution Act Further Amendment Act 1913 (No. 1148) increased the size of the Council (among other changes), by dividing the Central District into Central District No. 1 and Central District No. 2, each of which elected four members.

Central district was divided  into Central District No. 1 and Central District No. 2 by the Constitution Act Further Amendment Act 1913 (No. 1148), each of which would have four representatives. The act provided that the sitting members should decide amongst themselves which three represented each of the two new districts. Their decision was
 Central District No. 1 — Jelley, Vaughan, and Wilson
 Central District No. 2 — Klauer, Styles, Wallis

References

Former electoral districts of South Australia